James Michael Chu (born 1958) is an American private equity manager who has served as the global co-chief executive officer (CEO) of L Catterton since 1989.

Early life and education 
Chu graduated from Bates College in Lewiston, Maine in 1980 with a B.A. in psychology and economics, where he was a member of the Board of Trustees from 1995 to 2013.

Career 
Chu held a variety of senior financial management positions with  The First Pacific Company, a Hong Kong publicly listed investment and management company which he joined in early 1983.  He founded Catterton-Simon Partners in 1982 with Frank Vest and U.S. Secretary of the Treasury William E. Simon. In 2015, Catterton Partners took on as minor partners Moët Hennessy Louis Vuitton (LVMH) and Groupe Arnault (the family office of Bernard Arnault, bringing together $12 billion in assets as L Catterton. In May 2018, his firm was listed as the 31st largest private equity firm in the world, based on capital raised over the prior five years.

Personal life 
Chu is married to Elizabeth Kalperis Chu and they have two grown children.

See also 
 List of Bates College people

Honors 
Marshall Scholarship

References 

American investors
American money managers
Bates College alumni
Living people
Private equity and venture capital investors
1958 births